Xestocasis is a moth genus of the superfamily Gelechioidea. It was described in the family Heliodinidae and is sometimes also listed in the Cosmopterigidae, but actually seems to belong in the Oecophoridae (possibly in the subfamily Stathmopodinae).

Species
Xestocasis antirrhopa Diakonoff, 1955
Xestocasis balanochrysa Meyrick, 1915
Xestocasis colometra Meyrick, 1915
Xestocasis erymnota Meyrick, 1917
Xestocasis hololampra Meyrick, 1915
Xestocasis iostrota (Meyrick, 1910)
Xestocasis lauta (Meyrick, 1921)
Xestocasis tetraconcha Meyrick, 1917

Former species
Xestocasis crocodelta Meyrick, 1915

Oecophorinae
Moth genera